Ein Qiniya or 'Ayn Kiniya is a Palestinian village in the northern West Bank, located  northwest of Ramallah and is a part of the Ramallah and al-Bireh Governorate. Ein Qiniya has existed since the Roman-era of rule in Palestine. The village is very small with no public structures or institutions and is governed by a local development committee. Ein Qiniya is regionally notable for being a spring and autumn time picnic resort.

There is an annual walk on March 4 from Ramallah to Ein Qiniyya in celebration of the spring.

Location
'Ein Qiniya is located (horizontally) 5.5 km west of Ramallah. It is bordered by Ramallah to the east, Al-Zaitounah  to the north, Al-Janiya and Deir Ibzi to the west, and Ein 'Arik and Beitunia to the south.

Important Bird Area
A 1,500 ha site in the vicinity of the village has been recognised as an Important Bird Area (IBA) by BirdLife International because it supports a population of short-toed snake-eagles.

History
A  Middle Bronze Age tomb was discovered here in 1934. Potsherds from the Hellenistic and Umayyad/Abbasid period have been found here.

Ein Qiniya has traditionally been identified with Ainqune of the Crusader era, one of the fiefs given by King Godfrey to the Church of the Holy Sepulchre. However, Finkelstein writes that this identification should be reconsidered. Potsherds from the Mamluk era have also been found here.

During the Mamluk era, it was stipulated that the whole of the revenue from Ein Qiniya should go to the al-Tankiziyya in Jerusalem. The building was completed in 1328–29.

Ottoman era
In 1517, the village was included in the Ottoman empire with the rest of Palestine, and in the 1596 tax-records it appeared as Ayn Qinya, located in the Nahiya of Jabal Quds of the Liwa of Al-Quds. The population was 32 households, all Muslim. They paid a tax rate of 33.3% on agricultural products, which included wheat, barley, summer crops, olive trees, vineyards and fruit trees, occasional revenues, goats and beehives; a total of 4,760 akçe. 1/3 of the income went to a waqf.

In 1838 it was noted as Ain Kinia, a Muslim village, located in the Beni Harith district, north of Jerusalem.

An official Ottoman village list from about 1870 showed that Ain Kina had 54  houses and a population of 205, though  the population count only included men.Hartmann, 1883, p.  125 noted  52 houses

In 1882, the PEF's Survey of Western Palestine (SWP) described Ain Kanieh as "a village of moderate size on a ridge".

In 1896 the population of '''Ain kinja was estimated to be about 135 persons.

British Mandate era

In 1917, most of the village's inhabitants were evacuated by the British army on suspicion that residents killed a British officer. The residents were relocated to Beitunia and Yalo. In the 1922 census of Palestine, conducted by the British Mandate authorities, Ain Qinia'' had a population of 56, all Muslims. This had increased in the 1931 census to  83, still all Muslims, in a total of 26 houses.

In the 1945 statistics the population was 100, all Muslims, while the total land area was 2,494 dunams, according to an official land and population survey. Of this, 1,276  were allocated for plantations and irrigable land, 569 for cereals, while 19 dunams were classified as built-up (urban) areas.

Jordanian era
In the wake of the 1948 Arab–Israeli War, and after the 1949 Armistice Agreements, Ein Qiniya came under Jordanian rule.

The Jordanian census of 1961 found 235 inhabitants.

1967 and after
Since the Six-Day War in 1967 Ein Qiniya has been under Israeli occupation.

After the 1995 accords 12.1% of village land was classified as Area B, the remaining 87.9% as Area C.

Israel has confiscated 157 dunams of village land in order to construct the Israeli settlement of Dolev.

In 1982 residents numbered 101, then after a mass migration of other Palestinians to the Ein Qiniya, the population rose to 464 in 1984. According to the Palestinian Central Bureau of Statistics, in 2006 it had a population of 807. In the 2007 PCBS census, there were 817 people living in the village.

References

Bibliography

 
  
 
 

 
 
 
 
   
  
 

 
  (Röhricht,  1893, RRH, pp. 16-17, No 74)

External links
Welcome To 'Ayn Kiniya
Survey of Western Palestine, Map 14:    IAA, Wikimedia commons 
'Ein Qiniya Village (Fact Sheet),  Applied Research Institute–Jerusalem (ARIJ)
  'Ein Qiniya Village Profile, ARIJ
'Ein Qiniya  aerial photo, ARIJ

Villages in the West Bank
Important Bird Areas of the State of Palestine